Betta foerschi is a species of gourami endemic to the island of Borneo, where it is only known from the southern portion. It inhabits creeks in the rain forest. It can be found in the aquarium trade. The specific name of this fish honours the German physician and aquarist Walter Foersch (1932-1993), who collected the type with his wife Edith Korthaus. Edith is honoured in the specific name of another species they discovered, Betta edithae.

References

foerschi
Taxa named by Jörg Vierke
Fish described in 1979